Terene Eva Donovan (born 27 December 1944) is an Australian archer.  She competed at three Olympic Games, in 1972, 1980 and 1984.

She is a member of the Australian Archery Hall of Fame.

References

External links
Profile at the Australian Olympic Committee

1944 births
Living people
Archers at the 1972 Summer Olympics
Archers at the 1980 Summer Olympics
Archers at the 1984 Summer Olympics
Australian female archers
Olympic archers of Australia
Place of birth missing (living people)
Sportspeople from Toowoomba